Patna is a large village located in Atru Tehsil of Baran district, Rajasthan, India, with a total of 402 families residing. The village has a population of 2133, of which 1139 are males while 994 are females, according to the Population Census of 2011.

Sex ratio 
Of the total population in Patna village, 12.14% are children aged 0–6. The average sex ratio in the village is 873, which is lower than the Rajasthan state average of 928. Additionally, the child sex ratio for Patna is 877, which is lower than the Rajasthan average of 888.

Literacy 
Patna village has a higher literacy rate that Rajasthan. As of 2011, the literacy rate in the village was 71.13%, with male literacy at 84.32% and female literacy at 56.01%.

References 

Gram Panchayats and Villages in Atru Tehsil